
Gmina Sępopol is an urban-rural gmina (administrative district) in Bartoszyce County, Warmian-Masurian Voivodeship, in northern Poland, on the border with Russia.

Villages
Apart from the town of Sępopol, Gmina Sępopol contains the villages and settlements of Boryty, Chełmiec, Długa, Dobroty, Domarady, Dzietrzychowo, Gaj, Gierkiny, Gulkajmy, Judyty, Kinwągi, Korytki, Langanki, Lipica, Liski, Łobzowo, Lwowiec, Majmławki, Masuny, Melejdy, Miedna, Ostre Bardo, Park, Pasławki, Pieny, Poniki, Prętławki, Przewarszyty, Retowy, Rogielkajmy, Romaliny, Romankowo, Roskajmy, Różyna, Rusajny, Rygarby, Śmiardowo, Smodajny, Smolanka, Stopki, Szczurkowo, Trosiny, Turcz, Wanikajmy, Wiatrowiec and Wodukajmy.

Neighbouring gminas
Gmina Sępopol is bordered by the gminas of Barciany, Bartoszyce and Korsze. It also borders Russia (Kaliningrad oblast).

References
Polish official population figures 2006

Sepopol
Bartoszyce County

de:Sępopol#Gmina Sępopol